Alexander Lagerström is a Swedish professional ice hockey winger who currently plays for Södertälje SK of the Elitserien.

References

External links

Living people
Södertälje SK players
1991 births
Swedish ice hockey right wingers
People from Södertälje
Sportspeople from Stockholm County